Mountainous River Landscape with Travelers is an early 17h century oil on panel painting by Flemish painter Tobias Verhaecht. The painting was sold to an unknown buyer at Sotheby's in New York City, on January 26, 2016.

Painting
The panoramic mountainous landscape "punctuated by rocky outcrops" is typical of Verhaecht. His painting adhered to the Weltlandschaft tradition started by Joachim Patinir and Pieter Bruegel the Elder. This was characterized by imaginary panoramic landscape seen from an elevated viewpoint, mountains and lowlands, water, and often buildings. Characteristic of World landscape were also attention to detail and staffage figures dwarfed by their fantastical surroundings. In his youth, Verhaecht reportedly traveled to Italy, where Francesco I de' Medici, Grand Duke of Tuscany became his patron in Florence. He then moved on to Rome where he painted landscape frescos. He returned to Antwerp by 1590. This oil on panel was realized upon Verhaecht's return to Antwerp.

References

1600s paintings
Landscape paintings
Paintings by Tobias Verhaecht